Phyllis Wiener (September 17, 1921 – January 1, 2013) was an American painter. Wiener was one of the first female artists to embrace the Abstract Art Movement in Minnesota.

Life and work
Wiener was born in Iowa City, Iowa. She studied with Grant Wood at the University of Iowa, 1940; Russel Green at Stephens Columbia College (Missouri), 1944; Cameron Booth at University of Minnesota in Minneapolis, 1950- 1953 &  1960-1962: and the Instituto Allende,  Guanajuato, Mexico, 1961. Her first group exhibition was in Boulder, Colorado with the Boulder Artist's Guild in 1941. By 1944 her art had reached all regions of the United States. Then from 1954 - 1959 the American Federations of Arts Traveling Exhibition included her artworks. Under the U.S. State Department in 9162 her paintings were in a group exhibition that toured American Embassies of Europe providing international  exposure. Her artwork was exhibited at the American Embassy in Papua New Guinea by the U.S. State Demaprment 1997. Her art career encompasses teaching art at the Walker Art Center, University of Minnesota at Minneapolis in the Extension Division and General College, Minnetonka Art Center at Minnetonka, Normandale Jr. College at Edina, and the College of St. Catherine at St. Paul.

Artistic style
Wiener's art was created, and then signed with her different last names throughout her life, since American women assumed their husbands last name during this era. This occurrence is common with women artists and if not documented will cause confusion in their lifetime body of work. Her maiden name is Zager with no art created under this name. She created, worked and exhibited under the following last names during these years: Phyllis Downs (1939–1961), Phyllis Ames (1962–1968) and Phyllis Wiener (1971–present). Wiener's work over the years has incorporated many interests, ranging from landscape and figure elements to multicultural textile patterns. Wiener became one of the first woman artists to garner serious attention in the male-dominated art world of the 1950s and 60s.

in 1984, Wiener's work was featured on the cover of Kalliope: A Journal of Women's Art and Literature.

In 1981, Phyllis Wiener said:
“Cameron Booth taught me about painting. I had many painting instructors, but Cameron Booth knew, and taught me, Abstract Expressionist ideas. It was the way I came into painting.”

In 2005, Molly Priesmeyer said in City Pages:
During the '50s, Wiener was one of the few exhibiting woman artists in Minnesota. (Four of the 23 artists in "Abstract Painting: Selected Works" are female.) "There was a lot of chauvinism," she says. "I remember one time someone said, 'There are few women who ever make it.' And my friend said to him, 'Well! You know, there are few men who ever make it, too!'"

References

External links 
 PHYLLIS WIENER (DOB 17 September 1921, Iowa City, IA) BIOGRAPHY FOR AMERICAN ARTISTS
 Phyllis Wiener was one of the first female painters in Minnesota’s abstract art movement. Dead Link
 Phyllis Wiener - Artist, Fine Art, Auction Records, Prices.
 Find works of art, auction results and sale prices of artist Phyllis Wiener.
 Phyllis Wiener American Painter, born in 1921
Phyllis Wiener. Rhapsody In Blue... and Red and Yellow The Minnesota Museum of American Art paints abstraction in living color.

1921 births
20th-century American painters
21st-century American painters
Abstract expressionist artists
Artists from Minnesota
American women painters
Painters from Iowa
People from Iowa City, Iowa
American contemporary painters
2013 deaths
20th-century American women artists
21st-century American women artists
Instituto Allende alumni
University of Iowa alumni
American expatriates in Mexico